A song written by Gerry Goffin and Carole King recorded by the following artists:

 the B side of the 1966 song "On This Side of Goodbye" by The Righteous Brothers
 from the 1969 album, Instant Replay by The Monkees
 the B side of the 1967 song “Tears, Tears, Tears” on the Atco Records label.